The Construction and Allied Workers' Union (CAWU) was a trade union representing building workers in South Africa.

The union was founded on 31 January 1987, when the Brick, Clay and Allied Workers' Union merged with relevant sections of six other unions:

 General and Allied Workers' Union
 General Workers' Union
 General Workers' Union of South Africa
 Metal and Allied Workers' Union
 South African Allied Workers' Union
 Transport and General Workers' Union

Like all its predecessors, the union affiliated to the Congress of South African Trade Unions.  The union's first general secretary was Desmond Mahasha, and its first president was David Ngcobo.  In later years, M. Oliphant became general secretary, and Fred Gona became president.

In 2001, the union merged into the National Union of Mineworkers.

References

Building and construction trade unions
Trade unions established in 1987
Trade unions disestablished in 2001
Trade unions in South Africa